Nemčavci is a village north of Murska Sobota in the Prekmurje region of Slovenia.

References

External links
Nemčavci on Geopedia

Populated places in the City Municipality of Murska Sobota